Princess Lalla Joumala Alaoui (born 1962, Rabat) is a Moroccan diplomat, Ambassador of Morocco to the United States, and the former Ambassador of Morocco to the United Kingdom.

Early life
Princess Lalla Joumala Alaoui was educated at the Mission laïque française of Rabat  then at the University of Oxford Faculty of Oriental Studies, where she graduated with a Bachelor in law. After, she settled in Casablanca, where she became active in some of the city's NGOs.

For a brief period in 1999–2000, she was diplomatic attaché at the Moroccan Embassy to United Nations.

She is the President of the Moroccan-British Society.

Family
She is the maternal first cousin and the paternal second cousin of King Mohammed VI; daughter of Prince Moulay Ali (a cousin of King Hassan II) and Princess Lalla Fatima Zohra, the eldest daughter of Mohammed V and the older half-sister of King Hassan II.

She married Iranian businessman Mohammad Reza Nouri Esfandiari (a relative of Princess Soraya, ex-Queen of Iran) in October 1986 and they have two children.

Honours
Awards
 – Honored Citizen of Dallas (15/11/2017).

She is a member of the Metropolitan Club of Washington DC, and a member of the Cosmos Club.

See also
Princess Lalla Aicha of Morocco (her aunt), also Ambassador to the United Kingdom in the 1960s.

References

External links
Embassy of Morocco to The Court of Saint James’s

Living people
1962 births
Ambassadors of Morocco to the United Kingdom
Moroccan women diplomats
Moroccan princesses
People from Rabat
Moroccan women ambassadors
Alumni of Lycée Descartes (Rabat)
Ambassadors of Morocco to the United States